Moss Turner-Samuels (19 October 1888 – 6 June 1957) was a Labour Party politician in the United Kingdom.

He was elected to the House of Commons at the 1923 general election as Member of Parliament (MP) for the Barnard Castle constituency, but lost his seat the following year in the 1924 election to the Conservative candidate, Cuthbert Headlam.

He was returned to Parliament twenty years later, in the Labour landslide at the 1945 general election, defeating the long-serving Conservative Leslie Boyce in Gloucester. He was re-elected at the next three general elections, but died in office at Westminster in 1957, aged 68. At the subsequent by-election, his seat was retained for Labour by Jack Diamond.

References

External links 
 

1888 births
1957 deaths
Labour Party (UK) MPs for English constituencies
UK MPs 1923–1924
UK MPs 1945–1950
UK MPs 1950–1951
UK MPs 1951–1955
UK MPs 1955–1959
Members of Parliament for Gloucester